In Greek mythology, Electryon (Ancient Greek: Ἠλεκτρύων) was a king of Tiryns and Mycenae or Medea in Argolis.

Family 
Electryon was the son of Perseus and Andromeda and thus brother of Perses, Alcaeus, Heleus, Mestor, Sthenelus, Cynurus, Gorgophone and Autochthe. He is most commonly married to Anaxo, daughter of his brother Alcaeus and sister of Amphitryon, but was instead married to Eurydice, daughter of Pelops, in some versions of the myth. His wife bore him a daughter Alcmena and many sons: Stratobates, Gorgophonus, Phylonomus, Celaeneus, Amphimachus, Lysinomus, Chirimachus, Anactor, and Archelaus. Electryon had an illegitimate son Licymnius by Midea, a Phrygian woman.

Mythology 
The six sons of Pterelaus, King of the Taphians, descended from Electryon's brother Mestor came to Mycenae to claim a share of kingdom. When Electryon spurned their request, they drove off his cattle; Electryon's sons battled against them, and all but Licymnius (on one side) and Everes (on the other) died. Everes sold the cattle to Polyxenus of Elis. Amphitryon, Electryon's nephew and promised in marriage to Alcmene, bought the cattle and returned them to his uncle, but accidentally killed him as he threw his club at one of the cows. Electryon's brother Sthenelus seized the throne of Mycenae, charged Amphitryon with murder, and sent him into exile.

|-

Notes

References 
Apollodorus, The Library with an English Translation by Sir James George Frazer, F.B.A., F.R.S. in 2 Volumes, Cambridge, MA, Harvard University Press; London, William Heinemann Ltd. 1921. ISBN 0-674-99135-4. Online version at the Perseus Digital Library. Greek text available from the same website.
Pausanias, Description of Greece with an English Translation by W.H.S. Jones, Litt.D., and H.A. Ormerod, M.A., in 4 Volumes. Cambridge, MA, Harvard University Press; London, William Heinemann Ltd. 1918. . Online version at the Perseus Digital Library
Pausanias, Graeciae Descriptio. 3 vols. Leipzig, Teubner. 1903.  Greek text available at the Perseus Digital Library.
 Smith, William; Dictionary of Greek and Roman Biography and Mythology, London (1873). "Ele'ctryon" , Amphi'tryon

Princes in Greek mythology
Kings of Mycenae
Kings in Greek mythology
Perseid dynasty
Mythology of Argolis